Vjekoslav Škrinjar (born 2 June 1969) is a Croatian retired football player.

Career
Škrinjar joined BSK Slavonski Brod from Borac Podvinje at age 12 and moved on to Yugoslav powerhouse Dinamo Zagreb for whom he played over 200 matches and won the domestic league and cup. He was on the pitch for the infamous Dinamo-Red Star Belgrade football riot in May 1990 that possibly ignited the beginning of the end for the Yugoslav First League.

He finished his career in the German second tier playing for FSV Mainz.

Post-playing career
Škrinjar went into construction and agricultural businesses after retiring as a player and also owns a hotel in Mandre, Pag.

References

External links
 
 
 povijestdinama.com
 povijestdinama.com

1969 births
Living people
Sportspeople from Slavonski Brod
Association football midfielders
Yugoslav footballers
Croatian footballers
NK Marsonia players
GNK Dinamo Zagreb players
NK Zagreb players
Gamba Osaka players
HNK Segesta players
1. FSV Mainz 05 players
Yugoslav First League players
Croatian Football League players
J1 League players
2. Bundesliga players
Croatian expatriate footballers
Expatriate footballers in Japan
Croatian expatriate sportspeople in Japan
Expatriate footballers in Germany
Croatian expatriate sportspeople in Germany